High Hope! is an album by jazz pianist Elmo Hope which was originally released on the Beacon label.

Reception

The Allmusic review by Scott Yanow stated "it is not an essential release, but the music is quite worthwhile and enjoyable. In fact, Elmo Hope's relatively slim discography makes all of his recordings quite valuable due to his talent".

Track listing
All compositions by Elmo Hope
 "Chips" - 4:56  
 "Moe's Bluff" - 4:19 
 "Happy Hour" - 4:03 
 "Mo Is On" - 4:28  
 "Maybe So" - 4:37   
 "Crazy" - 4:15

Personnel 
Elmo Hope - piano
Paul Chambers (tracks 1-3), Butch Warren (tracks 4-6) - bass
Granville T. Hogan (tracks 4-6) Philly Joe Jones (tracks 1-3) - drums

References 

1962 albums
Elmo Hope albums